A hypothetical star is a star, or type of star, that is speculated to exist but has yet to be definitively observed. Hypothetical types of stars have been conjectured to exist, have existed or will exist in the future universe.

Types

Scientifically speculated hypothetical types include:

Specific stars

Specific hypothetical stars include:

See also
Hypothetical astronomical object

References

Further reading

Schunck,  F.E. and E.W. Mielke: "General relativistic boson stars", Class. Quantum. Grav. Vol. 20, R301 - R356 (2003)